Rita Mažukelytė (born 18 September 1985) is a Lithuanian football forward.

Honours 
Gintra Universitetas
Winner
 A Lyga (3): 2010, 2011, 2012

External links
 

1985 births
Living people
Lithuanian women's footballers
Women's association football forwards
Lithuania women's international footballers
Gintra Universitetas players